Djongu Assembly constituency is one of the 32 assembly constituencies of Sikkim, a north east state of India. This constituency falls under Sikkim Lok Sabha constituency.

This constituency is reserved for members of the Bhutia-Lepcha community.

Members of Legislative Assembly

 1979: Athup Lepcha, Sikkim Janata Parishad
 1985: Sonam Choda Lepcha, Sikkim Sangram Parishad
 1989: Sonam Choda Lepcha, Sikkim Sangram Parishad
 1994: Sonam Ghyoda Lepcha, Indian National Congress
 1999: Sonam Gyatso Lepcha, Sikkim Sangram Parishad
 2004: Sonam Gyatso Lepcha, Sikkim Democratic Front
 2009: Sonam Gyatso Lepcha, Sikkim Democratic Front
 2014: Sonam Gyatso Lepcha, Sikkim Democratic Front

Election results

2019

See also

 Sikkim Lok Sabha constituency
 North Sikkim district

References

Assembly constituencies of Sikkim
Mangan district